The Russian Famine Relief Act of 1921 was formed by the United States Congress on February 24, 1919, with a budget of 100 million dollars ($ in ). Its budget was boosted by private donations, which resulted in another 100 million dollars. In the immediate aftermath of the war, the program delivered more than four million tons of relief supplies to 23 war-torn European countries. Between 1919 and 1921, Arthur Cuming Ringland was chief of mission in Europe. ARA ended its operations outside Russia in 1922; it operated in Russia until 1923.

Under Herbert Hoover, very large scale food relief was distributed to Europe after the war through the American Relief Administration. In 1921, to ease the devastating famine in the Russian SFSR that was triggered by the Soviet government's war communism policies, the ARA's director in Europe, Walter Lyman Brown, began negotiating with the Russian People's Commissar for Foreign Affairs, Maxim Litvinov, in Riga, Latvia (at that time not yet annexed by the USSR). An agreement was reached on August 21, 1921, and an additional implementation agreement was signed by Brown and People's Commissar for Foreign Trade Leonid Krasin on December 30, 1921. The U.S. Congress appropriated $20,000,000 for relief under the Russian Famine Relief Act of late 1921. Hoover strongly detested Bolshevism, and felt the American aid would demonstrate the superiority of Western capitalism and thus help contain the spread of communism.

At its peak, the ARA employed 300 Americans, more than 120,000 Russians and fed 10.5 million people daily. Its Russian operations were headed by Col. William N. Haskell. The Medical Division of the ARA functioned from November 1921 to June 1923 and helped overcome the typhus epidemic then ravaging Russia. The ARA's famine relief operations ran in parallel with much smaller Mennonite, Jewish and Quaker famine relief operations in Russia.
	

The ARA's operations in Russia were shut down on June 15, 1923, after it was discovered that Russia under Lenin renewed the export of grain.

References 

 
 
 

1921 in law
Herbert Hoover
Famines in the Soviet Union
Humanitarian aid organizations of World War I
Philanthropic organizations based in the United States
Soviet Union–United States relations
1921 in international relations
1921 in the United States
1921 in Russia